Ustriclapex is a genus of moths belonging to the subfamily Olethreutinae of the family Tortricidae.

Species
Ustriclapex numellata (Meyrick, 1912)
Ustriclapex speculatrix (Meyrick, 1907)

Etymology
The generic name is an anagram of the specific name of the type species Ustriclapex speculatrix.

See also
List of Tortricidae genera

References

Eucosmini
Tortricidae genera